In Andalusia, comarcas have no defined administrative powers; many municipalities have gathered together to form mancomunidades in order to provide basic services, but those do not always coincide with the traditional comarcas. The current (2007) Statute of Autonomy of Andalusia, unlike its 1981 predecessor, allows for the establishment and regulation of official comarcas under its Title III, Article 97, which defines the significance of comarcas and sets the basis for future legislation in this area.

In 2003, the Council of Tourism and Sports of the Regional Government of Andalusia published an order in which it defined the comarca as "a geographic space with some homogeneous natural characteristicas, which produce social relations of immediacy and closeness, and present some common natural, economic and social characteristics and some common interests." This defined the official comarcas of Andalusia in the number of 62, as the following ones:

Notes